Michael Robert Kremer (born November 12, 1964) is an American development economist who is University Professor in Economics And Public Policy at the University of Chicago. He is the founding director of the Development Innovation Lab at the Becker Friedman Institute for Economics. Kremer served as the Gates Professor of Developing Societies at Harvard University until 2020. In 2019, he was jointly awarded the Nobel Memorial Prize in Economics, together with Esther Duflo and Abhijit Banerjee, "for their experimental approach to alleviating global poverty."

Early life and education
Michael Robert Kremer was born in 1964 to Eugene and Sara Lillian (née Kimmel) Kremer in New York City. His father, Eugene Kremer was the son of Jewish immigrants to the US from Austria-Poland. His mother, Sara Lillian Kremer was a professor of English literature, who specialized in American Jewish and Holocaust literature.  Her parents were Jewish immigrants to the US from Poland. He graduated from Harvard University (A.B. in Social Studies in 1985 and Ph.D. in economics in 1992).

Career
A postdoctoral fellow at Massachusetts Institute of Technology (MIT) from 1992 to 1993, Kremer was a visiting assistant professor at the University of Chicago in Spring 1993, and professor at MIT from 1993 to 1999. From 1999 to 2020, he was a professor at Harvard University. He joined the faculty at the University of Chicago as a professor in the Kenneth C. Griffin Department of Economics, the College, and the Harris School of Public Policy on September 1, 2020.

Kremer has focused his research on poverty reduction, often as it relates to education economics and health economics. Working with Abhijit Banerjee and Esther Duflo (with whom he shared the 2019 Nobel Memorial Prize in Economics), he helped establish the effectiveness of randomized controlled trials to test proposed antipoverty measures. Describing Kremer's early use of pioneering experimental methods, Duflo said that Kremer "was there from the very beginning, and took enormous risks. [...] He is a visionary."

Kremer is a Fellow of the American Academy of Arts and Sciences, a recipient of a MacArthur Fellowship (1997) and a Presidential Faculty Fellowship, and was named a Young Global Leader by the World Economic Forum. He is a research affiliate at Innovations for Poverty Action (IPA), a New Haven, Connecticut-based research outfit dedicated to creating and evaluating solutions to social and international development problems. Kremer is a lifetime member of Giving What We Can, an effective altruism organization whose members pledge to give 10% of their income to effective charities. He is founder and president of WorldTeach, a Harvard-based organization which places college students and recent graduates as volunteer teachers on summer and year-long programs in developing countries around the world. He is also co-founder of Precision Development (PxD), a non-profit organization that leverages the global emergence of the mobile phone to provide digital agronomic advisory services to smallholder farmers at scale.

Kremer started the advanced market commitment, which focuses on creating incentive mechanisms to encourage the development of vaccines for use in developing countries, and the use of randomized trials to evaluate interventions in the social sciences. He created the well-known economic theory regarding skill complementarities called Kremer's O-Ring Theory of Economic Development. In 2000, Kremer, along with Charles Morcom, published a study recommending that governments fight elephant poaching by stockpiling ivory and so that they can proactively flood the market if elephant populations decline too severely.

In his widely cited paper "Population Growth and Technological Change: One Million B.C. to 1990", Kremer studied economic change over the last one million years. He found that economic growth increased with population growth.

Kremer led a panel on the reformation of education systems at the International Growth Centre's Growth Week 2010. In early 2021, he was appointed by the G20 to the High Level Independent Panel (HLIP) on financing the global commons for pandemic preparedness and response, co-chaired by Ngozi Okonjo-Iweala, Tharman Shanmugaratnam and Lawrence Summers.

Recognition
 2019 – Nobel Memorial Prize in Economic Sciences, together with co-researchers Abhijit Banerjee and Esther Duflo, "for their experimental approach to alleviating global poverty".
 2018 – Boris Mints Institute Prize for Research of Strategic Policy Solutions to Global Challenges.
 2005 – Kenneth J. Arrow Award for best paper in health economics, awarded by the International Health Economics Association (IHEA).

Personal life
Kremer is the husband of economist Rachel Glennerster.

References

Bibliography

External links
 Home page 
 Innovations for Poverty Action
 Precision Agriculture for Development (PAD)
 Profile and Papers at Research Papers in Economics/RePEc
 Publications at the National Bureau of Economic Research
  including the Prize Lecture 8 December 2019 Experimentation, Innovation, and Economics

1964 births
20th-century American economists
21st-century American economists
American Nobel laureates
American people of Polish-Jewish descent
Center for Global Development
Fellows of the American Academy of Arts and Sciences
Fellows of the Econometric Society
Harvard University alumni
Harvard University faculty
Jewish American economists
Living people
MacArthur Fellows
Massachusetts Institute of Technology faculty
Members of the United States National Academy of Sciences
Nobel laureates in Economics
Place of birth missing (living people)
University of Chicago faculty
Recipients of the Presidential Early Career Award for Scientists and Engineers